Gavahan (also Romanized as Gāvāhan; also known as Kāvāhīn) is a village in Keyvan Rural District, in the Central District of Khoda Afarin County, East Azerbaijan Province, Iran. At the 2006 census, its population was 82, in 19 families.

In the wake of the White Revolution (early 1960s) a clan of the Mohammad Khanlu tribe, comprising 50 households, used Gavahan as their winter quarters.

References 

Populated places in Khoda Afarin County
Kurdish settlements in East Azerbaijan Province